is a former Japanese football player.

Playing career
Tanaka was born in Nagasaki Prefecture on July 27, 1971. After graduating from high school, he joined Nippon Steel (later Nippon Steel Yawata) in 1990. Although he played as regular player from first season, the club finished at bottom place and was relegated to Regional Leagues. In 1992, he moved to Sanfrecce Hiroshima. Although he played all matches in 1992 J.League Cup, his opportunity to play decreased from 1993. He could not play at all in the match in 1994 and he moved to Japan Football League (JFL) club Vissel Kobe in 1995. In 1996, he moved to JFL club Tosu Futures (later Sagan Tosu). He played all matches until 1997. However his opportunity to play decreased for injury in 1998 and he retired end of 1998 season.

Club statistics

References

External links

biglobe.ne.jp

1971 births
Living people
Association football people from Nagasaki Prefecture
Japanese footballers
Japan Soccer League players
J1 League players
Japan Football League (1992–1998) players
Nippon Steel Yawata SC players
Sanfrecce Hiroshima players
Vissel Kobe players
Sagan Tosu players
Association football midfielders